Naomi Mégroz (born 6 August 1998) is a Swiss footballer who plays as a midfielder and has appeared for the Switzerland national team.

Career
Mégroz has been capped for the Switzerland national team, appearing for the team during the 2019 FIFA World Cup qualifying cycle.

References

External links
 
 
 

1998 births
Living people
Swiss women's footballers
Swiss expatriate sportspeople in Germany
Expatriate women's footballers in Germany
Switzerland women's international footballers
Women's association football midfielders
SC Freiburg (women) players
Frauen-Bundesliga players
FC Zürich Frauen players
Swiss Women's Super League players
Footballers from Zürich